The 2021 European Table Tennis Championships were held in Cluj-Napoca, Romania, from 28 September to 3 October 2021.

The 2021 championships will include men's and women's team events.

Medal summary

Medallists

Medal table

Men's team

Players 
Source:

Group stage

Group A

Group B

Group C

Group D

Group E

Group F

Group G

Group H

Final round

Women's team

Players 
Source:

Group stage 
Group A

Group B

Group C

Group D

Group E

Group F

Group G

Group H

Final round

See also

2021 Europe Top 16 Cup

References

External links

Official site
International Table Tennis Federation
European Table Tennis Union

2021
European Championships
Table Tennis
European Table Tennis Championships
International sports competitions hosted by Romania
Sport in Cluj-Napoca
European Table Tennis Championships
European Table Tennis Championships